Daundy is a surname. Notable people with the surname include:

Robert Daundy (by 1500–1558), English businessman and politician
Edmund Daundy (by 1468–1515), English politician and merchant
Joan Daundy, mother of Thomas Wolsey

See also
Dandy (surname)